So Nishikawa (born 18 June 2001), is a Japanese-Australian professional footballer who plays as a defender for the San Diego State Aztecs.

Club career

Melbourne Victory
Nishikawa joined the Melbourne Victory Youth prior to the 2018–19 Y-League, and made his debut on 10 November 2018 in a 2-3 loss to Adelaide United. Nishikawa made his debut for the senior squad on 15 March 2020 in 0-3 loss to Wellington Phoenix.

He left the Victory in June 2021 to play for San Diego State Aztecs.

Career statistics

Footnotes

A.  Includes appearances in the FFA Cup.
B.  Includes appearances in the AFC Champions League.
C.  Includes appearances in the A-League finals.

References

2001 births
Living people
Association football defenders
Australian soccer players
Australian people of Japanese descent
Melbourne Victory FC players
A-League Men players
National Premier Leagues players